Alvaro Ernesto is a Peruvian record producer, DJ. Born in 1984, he early got in touch with different musical expressions, devices and behaviours. He started spinning records and dealing with creative processing through various kinds of electronic music at the age of 12.

In 2008, he released his first EPs on the Mexican label BIT Records. He already cooperated with the labels Chillin Music, Documenti Sonori, Gastspiel, among others.

External links
 Alvaro Ernesto Beatport Page

Peruvian musicians
Living people
Peruvian record producers
Year of birth missing (living people)